Timothy Uzochukwu Obi (9 April 1946 — 17 June 2022) was a Nigerian veterinary professor at the University of Ibadan. He was a member of the Third World Academy of Sciences, African Academy of Sciences, Nigerian Academy of Science. He was also a former Director of  Veterinary Teaching Hospital, Ibadan, and he was listed in  Marquis Who's Who biography.

Early life 
Obi was born in Okija, Anambra State Nigeria on 9 April 1946 into the family of Walter Robinson and Esther Nneka Okeke Obi.

Career 
From 1973 to 1974, he was a veterinary officer at the  Ministry of Livestock in Nigeria. In 1975, he became a lecturer at the university of Ibadan where he rose through the academic ladder to become a professor in 1988. In 1991, he became the Director of  Veterinary Teaching Hospital, Ibadan and in 1995, he became the Head of Department of Veterinary medicine, University of Ibadan.

Fellowship and membership 
Obi was a Fellow of the Nigeria Institute of Biology (FNIBiol.), the College of Veterinary Surgeons of Nigeria (FCVSN), the Academy of Science of Nigeria, African Academy of Sciences and the Third World Academy of Sciences (TWAS).

References 

2022 deaths
University of Ibadan alumni
University of Ibadan people
People from Anambra State
1946 births
Fellows of the African Academy of Sciences
TWAS fellows
Fellows of the Nigerian Academy of Science